Urta Qeshlaq-e Olya (also Romanized as Ūrtā Qeshlāq-e ‘Olyā; also known as Ūrtā Qeshlāq) is a village in Quri Chay-ye Gharbi Rural District, Saraju District, Maragheh County, East Azerbaijan Province, Iran. At the 2006 census, its population was 213, in 36 families.

References 

Towns and villages in Maragheh County